Pine Apple is a town in Wilcox County, Alabama, United States. It incorporated in 1872. Per the 2020 census, the population was 143.  It has two places on the National Register of Historic Places, the Hawthorne House and the Pine Apple Historic District.

History
Pine Apple was originally called Friendship, and under the latter name was laid out in 1825. The present name was given in 1852 on account of there being pine and apple groves near the town site.

Geography
Pine Apple is located at  (31.867882, -86.987624).

Demographics

2020 census

Note: the US Census treats Hispanic/Latino as an ethnic category. This table excludes Latinos from the racial categories and assigns them to a separate category. Hispanics/Latinos can be of any race.

2000 Census
At the 2000 census there were 145 people, 65 households, and 44 families in the town. The racial makeup of the town was 62.76% White, 36.55% Black or African American, and 0.69% from two or more races.
Of the 65 households 20.0% had children under the age of 18 living with them, 55.4% were married couples living together, 10.8% had a female householder with no husband present, and 32.3% were non-families. 32.3% of households were one person and 18.5% were one person aged 65 or older. The average household size was 2.23 and the average family size was 2.82.

The age distribution was 22.8% under the age of 18, 4.1% from 18 to 24, 22.8% from 25 to 44, 22.8% from 45 to 64, and 27.6% 65 or older. The median age was 45 years. For every 100 females, there were 81.3 males. For every 100 females age 18 and over, there were 80.6 males.

The median household income was $35,625 and the median family income  was $44,583. Males had a median income of $29,583 versus $30,833 for females. The per capita income for the town was $16,876. There were 7.7% of families and 15.8% of the population living below the poverty line, including 35.9% of under eighteens and 14.3% of those over 64.

Notable people 
Fred Cone - a former running back in the NFL for the Green Bay Packers and Dallas Cowboys.
Kenneth R. Giddens - Broadcaster and Voice of America executive.
Philemon T. Herbert - former U.S. Representative from California

References

Towns in Wilcox County, Alabama
Towns in Alabama
1825 establishments in Alabama
Populated places established in 1825